This is a list of films which placed number-one at the box office in Australia during 2006. Amounts are in Australian dollars, which is the type of currency in Australia. Also included are the positions at the box office other films opened at. Quite a number of these are films from the previous year due to normal Australian film distribution delays. The number a film opens at does not necessarily denote its highest placement at the box office (for example, Garfield: A Tail of Two Kitties debuted at #13 and later peaked at #3), but is intended as an indication and a guide to what theatrically released films opened and when.

References
Urban Cinefile – Box Office

See also
 List of Australian films – Australian films by year
 2006 in film

2006
Australia
2006 in Australian cinema